Katlego Pule (born 10 September 1990) is a South African football (soccer) defender for Premier Soccer League club Bidvest Wits.

References

1990 births
South African soccer players
Living people
Association football defenders
Sportspeople from Soweto
Bidvest Wits F.C. players
African Games silver medalists for South Africa
African Games medalists in football
Competitors at the 2011 All-Africa Games